Karl Jobst (born 7 February 1986) is an Australian GoldenEye 007 and Perfect Dark speedrunner, YouTuber, and investigative journalist whose work has focused on exposing cheating and fraud in the gaming community. He also covers other speedrunning and challenge-related feats, such as world record histories. As of July 2022, he has more than 700,000 subscribers on YouTube.

Early life 
Jobst began playing video games at age two and a half; his first gaming experience was with the PC game Ultima V, and his first console was a Nintendo 64 he received in 1997. He briefly studied IT and psychology at university, and spent time working at a chicken factory, a mobile phone shop, and a call center.

Speedrunning career 
Jobst began speedrunning in 1999 when competing for fast times in GoldenEye 007 with a friend before moving on to Perfect Dark. He eventually set the speedrunning world record for the first level of GoldenEye 007 on 2 December 2017, completing the run in 52 seconds on the Agent difficulty, beating a 53-second record set by former Perfect Dark world champion Bryan Bosshardt on 27 September 2002. This feat was described by Owen S. Good of gaming magazine Polygon as "akin to the sub-four[-]minute mile, multiplied by breaking the sound barrier." 

He is ranked third by number of Goldeneye 007 world records by the game's speedrunning authority. Jobst was recognised as the "Perfect Dark Champion" (meaning he was statistically deemed the number-one player in the world at the game, according to the community's rankings) from 10 November 2002 – 24 December 2003; 26 July 2016 – 30 July 2016; 31 July 2016 – 19 March 2020; and 21 March 2020 – 25 March 2020 (tied). As of 11 March 2022, Jobst had set 199 world individual level records throughout his career, of which 9 remain (albeit all subsequently tied by other players).

In late 2021, Jobst started a speedrunning podcast called The Legends Postcast. In September 2021, Legends co-host Tomatoanus announced the cancellation of future episodes and the taking down of previous episodes, after Jobst was accused of racism. In a video, Jobst denied the allegations, stating that messages had been taken out of context.

Investigative work

Heritage Auctions and Wata Games allegations 
On 23 August 2021, Jobst released a YouTube documentary alleging fraud and conflict of interest between Heritage Auctions, a company selling retro video games for record-breaking prices (including a copy of Super Mario Bros. for over ), Wata Games, an agency that grades rare games, and video game collectors with the intention of manufacturing a bubble of retro games. Jobst alleged that Wata CEO Deniz Kahn and Heritage Auctions co-founder Jim Halperin of manipulating the market through press releases and television appearances on Pawn Stars while limiting the availability of information by purchasing and shutting down retro gaming site NintendoAge. Wata Games denied the claims immediately after Jobst published the video. In a statement made to Video Games Chronicle, Heritage Auctions responded to Jobst's video by saying they had not engaged in any illegal activity. In a June 2022 follow-up video Jobst detailed a class action lawsuit filed against Wata Games and its owner Collectors Universe in May 2022 for market manipulation and other alleged financial impropriety.

Badabun allegations 
In December 2017, Mexican media network Badabun uploaded a video purportedly showing network member Tavo Betancourt speedrunning Super Mario Bros. in record time. Jobst uploaded a video in January 2020 revealing that the Badabun video had been faked, showing various inconsistencies and irregularities found within the alleged speedrun footage and demonstrating that the footage was spliced from videos by several actual world record holders in the game, as well as from a tool-assisted speedrun.

Billy Mitchell allegations 
American gamer Billy Mitchell was accused by Jobst of cheating to obtain his records in the arcade games Donkey Kong and Pac-Man, allegations that had already been made for years. Mitchell sued Jobst for defamation, seeking damages of $450,000, having also sued YouTuber Benjamin Smith, known as Apollo Legend, and speedrunning site Twin Galaxies for similar grievances. Jobst's allegations against Mitchell also included claims that Mitchell's lawsuit against Smith contributed to his poor mental health and suicide, but he has since clarified that this was far less likely than he originally thought. Ultimately, Jobst was sued three times, having already spent about $180,000 on legal fees, and he had estimated a further $100,000 in legal costs to defend himself; all lawsuits were dismissed. Jobst set up a legal defence fund on GoFundMe to mitigate the financial damage to his family due to the lawsuit. As of February 2023, it has raised US$144,279.

In January 2023, Jobst made a video that showcased evidence in the form of an old photograph that clearly demonstrated that Mitchell did not play his claimed world record runs on original hardware despite claiming so for many years. In addition, the 8-direction joystick (as opposed the original 4-direction joystick) would have made the game much easier to play. The lawsuits against Jobst and others have been considered by presiding judges and media commentators to be frivolous, if not downright vexatious.

Guitar Hero cheating 
In January 2022, Jobst alleged in a video that a well-known Guitar Hero player and world-record holder called Schmooey had cheated to obtain his records, faking video with prerecorded segments and footage splicing. Jobst's video went viral, and Schmooey responded by confirming his video records were entirely falsified.

Other investigations 
Jobst has covered other cheating scandals in the gaming community, including an incident of cheating by the biggest Minecraft speedrunner Dream, which resulted in his records being struck from the leaderboard.

In August 2019, Jobst reported on the world record of E1M1, the first level of Doom, that had recently been broken by 4shockblast. The record had stood for over 20 years.

References

External links 

Living people
1986 births
Video game speedrunners
Australian esports players
Twitch (service) streamers
Australian YouTubers
Video game journalism
People from Brisbane